Alison Leeds Prentice (July 8, 1934 - June 25, 2021) was a Canadian historian and a member of the Order of Canada.

Prentice was born in Delaware, in 1934, and immigrated to Canada in 1939.  She spent the rest of her childhood in Canada, and earned her Bachelor, Masters and PhD from the University of Toronto.  She became a Canadian citizen in 1959.

Prentice founded and was the first director of the Centre for Women's Studies in Education at the Ontario Institute for Studies in Education.

She earned her PhD from the University of Toronto in 1972, and was recognized with honorary doctorates from the University of Guelph and the University of Western Ontario, in 1993 and 1997.  In 1998, the year she retired from the University of Toronto, the Ontario Historical Society created an award in her name for the best book on Women's History, and she became a member of the Royal Society of Canada.  In 2013, she became a member of the Order of Canada.

References

1934 births
2021 deaths
Academics from Delaware
American emigrants to Canada
Canadian women historians
Members of the Order of Canada
20th-century Canadian historians
University of Toronto alumni
Academic staff of the University of Toronto